Toxotacma is a genus of moth in the family Gelechiidae. It contains the species Toxotacma meditans, which is found in India (Assam).

The wingspan is about 10 mm. The forewings are dark fuscous minutely speckled whitish, darker and blackish-sprinkled towards the costa and termen. There is a group of raised blackish and dark fuscous scales towards the tornus. There is an undefined spot of yellow-ochreous suffusion towards the apex. The hindwings are rather dark grey.

References

Gelechiinae